Karzan Kader (born 8 September 1982)  is an Iraqi Kurdish film actor, director, writer. He lives in Stockholm. Karzan Kader was nine years old when his family fled Kurdistan during the Iraq War in 1990. They settled in Sweden, where Kader and his siblings were raised. In 2007 he enrolled in Stockholm Academy of Dramatic Arts (SADA) to study directing. His short film "Bekas" eventually won a Student Oscar and was developed into the acclaimed feature-length film by the same name.

Karzan graduated from Dramatiska Institutet as a Film director in 2010 and won a Student Award for his graduation film.

Filmography

As an Actor

As a director

References

External links

1982 births
Swedish people of Kurdish descent
Iraqi Kurdish people
Kurdish film directors
Living people
Swedish male actors
Dramatiska Institutet alumni